Olivinae is a subfamily of sea snails, marine gastropod mollusks in the family Olividae, the olives.

Genera 
The following genera are accepted within Olivinae:
 Felicioliva Petuch & Berschauer, 2017
 Oliva Bruguière, 1789
 Omogymna Martens, 1897
 Recourtoliva Petuch & Berschauer, 2017
 Vullietoliva Petuch & Berschauer, 2017

References

Olividae
Gastropods described in 1825